Alexander Bublik was the defending champion but chose not to defend his title.

Dennis Novikov won the title after defeating Christian Garín 6–4, 6–3 in the final.

Seeds

Draw

Finals

Top half

Bottom half

References
Main Draw
Qualifying Draw

Morelos Open - Singles
2018 Singles